Ian Freebairn-Smith  (born March 4, 1932) is an American composer, arranger, conductor and group singer in film and TV. He spans from classical to popular music, jazz, choral music, and new music.

Early life and education
Ian Freebairn-Smith was born in Seattle, Washington. He began studying composition in high school. He then attended the Los Angeles Conservatory of Music, the University of Pennsylvania, and UCLA. He later studied film scoring with Leith Stevens.

Career
Freebairn-Smith began as a group singer with the California Dreamers and The Singers Incorporated, followed by choral arranging, orchestra arranging, and composing for motion pictures. He wrote the scores for films like The Strawberry Statement and was instrumental in the composing of scores for "The Muppet Movie" and "A Star is Born." He also wrote the score for a film called The End, starring Burt Reynolds. In 1977, he won a Grammy Award for best arrangement accompanying a vocalist, for "Evergreen" sung by Barbra Streisand. He arranged and conducted for The Hi-Lo's, The Four Freshmen, Liza Minnelli, Frederica von Stade, Andy Williams, Anthony Newley, Stephen Bishop, Harry Nilsson, Phil Ochs, Paul Williams, Jeff Beck, and others.
As late as April 2018, Freebairn-Smith had given a master class at LA Valley College.

Personal life
As of 2018, he was married to Shari Zippert with one daughter, Vanessa, who are both musicians in Los Angeles. He has three daughters from his first marriage, two of whom, Alison and Jennifer, are singer/songwriters.

References

21st-century American composers
Living people
American male composers
1932 births
21st-century American male musicians